Joachim is a Germanic surname, ultimately derived from the Biblical king Jehoiakim. Pronunciation varies, and may be wa-keem' or jo'-akim.

People with this surname
 Amalie Joachim (1839–1899), Austrian-German contralto and voice teacher, wife of Joseph
 Attila Joachim (1923–1947), Hungarian Holocaust victim
 Aurélien Joachim (born 1986), Luxembourgian footballer
 Benoît Joachim (born 1976), Luxembourgian professional road racing cyclist
 Charlie Joachim (1920–2002), American basketball player
 Ferenc Joachim (1882–1964), Hungarian (Magyar) painter of portraits and landscapes
 Harold H. Joachim (1868–1938), British idealist philosopher
 Irène Joachim (1913–2001), French soprano; grand-daughter of the violinist Joseph Joachim
 Joseph Joachim (1831–1907), Hungarian violinist, conductor, composer and teacher, husband of Amalie
 (1834–1904), Swiss author
 Julian Joachim (born 1974), English professional footballer
 Otto Joachim (composer) (1910–2010), German-born Canadian musician and composer of electronic music
 Suresh Joachim (fl. 2005), Sri Lankan (Tamil) international Record collector

See also 
 Joachim (given name)
 Joachim genannt Thalbach (disambiguation)

German-language surnames
Jewish surnames
Hebrew-language surnames
Yiddish-language surnames